The Bol d’Or is a 24-hour endurance race for motorcycles, held annually in France. The riding of each bike is now shared by a team of three riders.

History

The Bol d’Or, first organized by Eugene Mauve, in 1922, was a race for motorcycles, and automobiles limited to 1100cc engine capacity (in the 1950s the limit was raised to 1500cc, and later to 2000cc). Today, the Bol d’Or is exclusively a race for motorcycles, although there are a number of side "attractions", such as races for amateur riders and for classic bikes.

Prior to 1953 only one rider per machine was permitted. The record holder with seven victories, Frenchman Gustave Lefèvre, won with an average speed of 107 kilometers/hour riding his Norton Manx for the whole 24 hours. From 1954 to 1977 the teams comprised two riders, and then,  in the interests of safety, this was increased to three.

Until 1970 the race was held at various circuits, mainly Linas-Montlhéry and Saint-Germain-en-Laye.  From 1971 to 1977 the Bol d’Or was held at the permanent Le Mans Bugatti circuit, which excludes the temporary street circuit section, exiting before the Tertre Rouge esses and rejoining at the Ford Chicane, excluding the section from the Tertre Rouge, Mulsanne, and Porsche Curves.  For the next 22 years the event took place at Paul Ricard, after which it moved to Magny-Cours.  When the race left Le Mans the 24 Heures du Mans was established, so that when the Bol d'Or returned to Le Mans, there were for a time two annual 24-hour motorcycle endurance events on the Bugatti circuit.  Until 2015, the Bol d’Or was held in the spring, while the 24 Heures du Mans was in the early September slot formerly used by the Bol d’Or. In 2016 things changed again: the "24 Heures du Mans" moved to the spring, while the Bol d’Or moved to Circuit Paul Ricard In September.

24-hour motorcycle endurance racing has a strong Francophone base, with the three main events held in France (Le Mans & Magny-Cours) and French-speaking Belgium (Spa-Francorchamps), and the most successful teams and riders are French. In 1970, 1971 and 1992 all-British teams of riders won the races. British rider Terry Rymer has had consistent results. In the 1970s the competitors included Phil Read and Neil Tuxworth, who later headed Honda Racing UK. On occasion, the Mead & Tomkinson racing team fielded "Nessie", a revolutionary bike with hub-center steering.

Circuits
 1923–1936: Loges track in Saint-Germain-en-Laye
 1927: Fontainebleau
 1937–1939: Linas-Montlhéry
 1938–1946: No race
 1947–1948: Saint-Germain-en-Laye
 1949–1950: Linas-Montlhéry
 1951: Saint-Germain-en-Laye
 1952–1960: Linas-Montlhéry
 1961–1968: No race
 1969–1970: Linas-Montlhéry
 1971–1977: Le Mans
 1978–1999: Paul Ricard
 2000–2014: Magny-Cours
 2015–: Paul Ricard

The race is part of the Endurance FIM World Championship. The 2016 edition was the 80th edition of the race.

The race is accompanied by a motorcycle rally, carnival and other motorcycle related events.

Results

Side races
 La Tasse d'or (the golden cup), reserved for motorcycle of less than 50cc (known as the coffee cup: "tasses à café")
 Le Bol d’Or classic (the classic golden bowl): reserved for classic motorcycles
 Le Bol d'argent (the silver bowl): amateur competition taking place before main competition.

External links
Bol d’Or official website .

References

Motorcycle races
Motorsport competitions in France
Endurance motor racing